Short Bull may refer to:
 Arnold Short Bull (c. 1845 -1915), Sicangu Lakota (or Brulé) leader, associated with Ghost Dance
 Grant Short Bull (c. 1852 -1935), Oglala Lakota leader
 A fictional US tank from Panzer Front.

Native American surnames